Melinda Olsson (born 9 September 1992) is a Swedish ice hockey player for Luleå HF and the Swedish national team.

She represented Sweden at the 2019 IIHF Women's World Championship.

References

External links

1992 births
Living people
People from Överkalix Municipality
Swedish women's ice hockey forwards
Sportspeople from Norrbotten County